Alpan is a village and municipality in the Quba Rayon of Azerbaijan.  

Populated places in Quba District (Azerbaijan)